Monory may refer to:

 René Monory (1923–2009),  French centre-right politician
 Jacques Monory (1924–2018),  French painter, living in Cachan